Here, Hear. is an EP by La Dispute, released on May 15, 2008 through Forest Life Records. The extended play contains a series of spoken-word tracks that focus on combining pieces of pre-existing poetry and writings with a variety of instrumentation.

Release
Released originally as a 7" Vinyl with 300 copies distributed in only one colour permuatation: white. It also accompanied the first 100 sales of the Untitled 7".

With the release of the third EP in the series on December 24, 2009, the first three volumes became available for download off Bandcamp; all proceeds will benefit well House Community Living of Grand Rapids, a non-profit outreach program in Grand Rapids that provides emergency shelter and permanent housing for homeless families. When the period of donation ended on January 17, 2010, La Dispute was able to raise $1715.44 for Well House. All subsequent donations go towards covering recording expenses of the band.

Lyrical Themes
Hear, Hear. uses poetry and writings from various artists: One is based upon Tom Robbins' Still Life with Woodpecker. Two is lyrics from the poem "somewhere i have never traveled" by E. E. Cummings. Three is based upon Edgar Allan Poe's poem "Annabel Lee". While Four is based upon an Asian myth, and the lyrics are amalgamations of different versions on the story. This story is the ground work for the lyrical theme of their debut album Somewhere at the Bottom of the River Between Vega and Altair.

Track listing

Personnel
Jordan Dreyer - lead vocals
Brad Vander Lugt - drums, keyboards, percussion
Chad Sterenberg - guitar
Kevin Whittemore - guitar
Adam Vass - bass, additional guitars

External links
  Download location of Here, Hear. on Bandcamp
 Well House Community living of Grand Rapids Charity Site

References

2008 EPs
La Dispute (band) EPs